This list includes properties and districts on the California Historical Landmarks listings for Sierra County, in eastern California.

Click the "Map of all coordinates" link to the right to view a Google map of all properties and districts with latitude and longitude coordinates in the table below.

|}

References

See also
National Register of Historic Places listings in Sierra County, California
List of California Historical Landmarks

.
List of California Historical Landmarks
Geography of Sierra County, California
Protected areas of Sierra County, California
California Gold Rush
Sierra County, California
History of the Sierra Nevada (United States)